The Crveni Krst concentration camp (lit. Red Cross concentration camp;), also known as the Niš concentration camp, located in Crveni Krst, Niš, was operated by the German Gestapo and used to hold captured Serbs, Jews and Romanis during the Second World War. Established in mid-1941, it was used to detain as many as 35,000 people during the war and was liberated by the Yugoslav Partisans in 1944. More than 10,000 people are thought to have been killed at the camp. After the war, a memorial to the victims of the camp was erected on Mount Bubanj, where many inmates were shot. A memorial museum was opened on the former campgrounds in 1967 and in 1979 the campgrounds were declared a Cultural Monument of Exceptional Importance and came under the protection of the Socialist Republic of Serbia.

History

Background
On 6 April 1941, Axis forces invaded the Kingdom of Yugoslavia. The Royal Yugoslav Army was quickly defeated and Belgrade was captured by 12 April. The country was then occupied and dismembered, with the Wehrmacht establishing the Territory of the Military Commander in Serbia under a government of military occupation. The territory included most of Serbia proper, with the addition of the northern part of Kosovo (centred on Kosovska Mitrovica), and the Banat. It was the only area of partitioned Yugoslavia in which the German occupants established a military government. This was done to exploit the key rail and riverine transport routes that passed through it, and due to its valuable resources, particularly non-ferrous metals. The Military Commander in Serbia appointed Serbian puppet governments to "carry on administrative chores under German direction and supervision". On 29 August 1941, the Germans appointed the Government of National Salvation (Влада Националног Спаса) under General Milan Nedić, to replace the short-lived Commissioner Administration. A pre-war politician who was known to have pro-Axis leanings, Nedić was selected because the Germans believed his fierce anti-Communism and military experience could be used to quell an armed uprising in the Serbian region of Šumadija. 

Unable to bring reinforcements due to the need to send soldiers to the Eastern Front, the Germans responded to the revolt by declaring that one-hundred Serbs would be executed for every German soldier killed and that fifty would be executed for every German soldier wounded. By October 1941, this policy had resulted in the deaths of 25,000 Serbs. The Germans also targeted Jews, who were subjected to forced labour, punitive taxing, and restrictive decrees. Jews were also registered with German authorities and forced to wear identifying armbands while Jewish property was confiscated. They, and to a lesser degree Romanis, were targeted on racial grounds, although most were not killed outright. Following the start of the anti-German uprising, German propaganda began associating Jews with Communism and anti-German ideology. Executions and arrests of Serbian Jews followed.

When the Germans occupied southeastern Serbian city of Niš in April 1941, they prohibited Romanis from leaving their homes without an identifying yellow armband bearing the word Zigeuner (Gypsy). German soldiers then went through the Romani quarter and forcibly shaved the heads of all Romanis in Niš under the pretext that they had lice.

Operation

The Crveni Krst (Red Cross) concentration camp was established by the German Gestapo in Niš in mid-1941. It was named after a Red Cross facility located near the campgrounds. Originally intended as a transit camp, by September of that year it was transformed into a concentration camp.

There were four categories of prisoners. First categories were hostages. They served for retaliation execution. For one killed occupying soldier 100, and for one wounded 50 hostages were killed. Second category were Jews. Third category of prisoners were persons arrested on suspicion of belonging or cooperating with the communist National Liberation Movement and their military units under Josip Broz Tito. The fourth category of prisoners consisted of those arrested on charge of belonging or cooperating with the Yugoslav Army in the Homeland, under the command of War Minister, Colonel Draža Mihailović.

Romani men, women and children were imprisoned at Crveni Krst shortly after its creation. In October 1941, 200–300 local and foreign Jews living in Niš were brought to the camp. More arrived later from towns in the Serbian interior. Laws passed by the Germans that September ensured that they would be detained separately from other inmates. The Germans began executing adult male inmates in early November. In January, a group of Serbian Partisans attacked the camp, freeing a small number of Jewish prisoners. The first mass executions occurred on Mount Bubanj in February 1942. Victims included many Romani inmates who were shot and killed as hostages here, with as many as 100 being shot on one day. That month, a group of inmates made an organized attempt to escape the camp. Although fifteen prisoners managed to escape, forty-two failed to do so and were killed. A second mass execution involved the shooting of large numbers of Serb and remaining Jewish inmates whose corpses were dumped into mass graves that the Germans had forced Romani prisoners to dig. That spring, the women and children detained at Crveni Krst were transferred to the Sajmište concentration camp on the outskirts of Belgrade, where they were murdered using gas vans. The camp remained in operation over the following two years before being liberated by the Partisans in 1944. Of the more than 35,000 inmates held at the camp during the war, an estimated 10,000 were killed.

Legacy

After the war, a memorial to the victims of the camp was erected on Mount Bubanj. A memorial museum was opened on the former campgrounds in 1967. The set up was prepared by the curator historians Ivana Gruden Miletinjević and Nebojša Ozimić. In 1979, the campgrounds were declared a Cultural Monument of Exceptional Importance and came under the protection of the Socialist Republic of Serbia. A film detailing the events at the camp titled Lager Niš was released in Yugoslavia in 1987. It was the only film revolving specifically around inmates in a concentration camp ever released in the country.

Notes

References

Books

Journals

Websites

 

Cultural Monuments of Exceptional Importance (Serbia)
Architecture in Serbia
World War II sites in Serbia
Serbia under German occupation
Jewish Serbian history
Nazi concentration camps in Yugoslavia
Nazi war crimes in Serbia